The Natal Government Railways Class I 2-6-2T of 1901 was a South African steam locomotive from the pre-Union era in the Colony of Natal.

In 1894, the Natal Government made provision for the extension of the North Coast line from Verulam to the Tugela River. The Zululand Railway Company was contracted for the construction of the line in 1895. In 1901, the company acquired one  side-tank locomotive as construction engine. Upon completion of the line in 1903, the locomotive was taken onto the roster of the Natal Government Railways and designated .

Zululand Railway Company
Provision for the extension of the North Coast line from Verulam to the Tugela River was made by Act 34 of 1894 of the Colony of Natal. On 19 December 1895, an agreement was reached with the Natal sugar magnate James Liege Hulett, representing the Zululand Railway Company, for the construction of the new line.

The government stipulated that the line was to be 3 feet 6 inches Cape gauge and laid with  steel rail. The agreement further stipulated that, upon its completion, the line would be taken over as part of the Natal Government Railways (NGR) system.

Manufacturer
In 1901, the construction company acquired a single  locomotive from Baldwin Locomotive Works in the United States of America, for use as construction engine. The locomotive, which became the Zululand Railway no. 1, was designed and built to American specifications and narrow-gauge practice at the time and, as a result, conformed to NGR practice only in respect of its Johnston link-and-pin couplers and brake gear.

Characteristics
The cylinders were arranged outside the bar frame while the slide valves, arranged above the cylinders, were actuated by Stephenson link motion through rocker shafts. Two sandboxes were mounted atop the boiler, fore and aft of the steam dome.

Service
The Tugela line was opened to traffic in 1903 and Zululand no. 1 was taken onto the NGR roster, where it was allocated no. 512.

It was later renumbered to 501 and was allocated to the Construction Department of the NGR. When a classification system was introduced at some stage between 1904 and 1908, it was designated NGR Class I.

When the Union of South Africa was established on 31 May 1910, the three Colonial government railways (Cape Government Railways, NGR and Central South African Railways) were united under a single administration to control and administer the railways, ports and harbours of the Union. Although the South African Railways and Harbours came into existence in 1910, the actual classification and renumbering of all the rolling stock of the three constituent railways were only implemented with effect from 1 January 1912.

In 1912, the Construction Department locomotives in Natal were considered obsolete. The locomotive was excluded from the South African Railways classification and renumbering schedules, renumbered to 0501 and remained unclassified. It was scrapped in March 1916.

References

0720
0720
2-6-2 locomotives
1C1 locomotives
Baldwin locomotives
Cape gauge railway locomotives
Railway locomotives introduced in 1901
1901 in South Africa
Scrapped locomotives